This is a list of Portuguese television related events from 2002.

Events
29 April - SIC Gold is rebranded as SIC Sempre Gold.
4 November - Singer Ricardo Vieira is voted winner of Big Brother Famosos 1.
31 December - Actor Vítor Norte wins Big Brother Famosos 2.

Debuts

Television shows

2000s
Big Brother (2000-2003)

Ending this year

Births

Deaths